Philippines–Saudi Arabia relations are the bilateral relations between the Philippines and Saudi Arabia. Formal diplomatic relations between the two countries were established on October 24, 1969. 

Both countries have embassies in each other's territory. The Philippines has an embassy in Riyadh, and a consulate-general in Jeddah.  Saudi Arabia has an embassy in Makati.

Muslim pilgrims from the Philippines visit the cities of Mecca and Medina as part of the Hajj. In 2019, the Philippines was given a quota of 8,000 pilgrims. The Bureau of Pilgrimage and Endowment of the National Commission of Muslim Affairs is responsible for administering and processing the travel requirements of Filipino pilgrims.

Trade relations

Before Spain colonized the Philippines, there were the existence of several Precolonial Sultanates in the Philippines: such as, Sulu, Maguindanao, Lanao, and the capital called Manila (Former colony of the Brunei Sultanate);  which had Sultans that could trace their descent to the prophet Mohammad, through Hashemites, Arabs who migrated to the Philippines.

In 2012, Saudi Arabia was the 10th largest trading partner of the Philippines, 31st and 8th largest market in the export and import market respectively. Saudi Arabia was also the Philippines' largest trading partner and import supplier, and second largest export market in the Middle East. According to the Saudi government, trade between Saudi Arabia and the Philippines amounted to $3.6 billion in 2011, a bigger figure from compared to the previous year's trade figure amounting to $2.7 billion.

Labor relations
The Philippines maintains a Philippine Overseas Labor Office in Riyadh to protect the rights of Overseas Filipino Workers in Saudi Arabia.

As of June 2013, there are about 674,000 Filipinos working in Saudi Arabia according to the Saudi Ministry of Interior. A landmark agreement on Filipino household service workers were signed between Saudi Arabia and the Philippines. The agreement was the first for Saudi Arabia with a labor-supplying country.

In 2012, about 150,000 Filipino female nurses are working in Saudi Arabia. This accounts for 25 percent of the total number of Overseas Filipino Workers in the Kingdom.

In November 2021, the Philippines stopped processing the deployment of OFWs to Saudi Arabia amidst reports of unpaid salaries and allegations of abuse by a general. This ban was lifted on November 7, 2022.

See also
 Filipinos in Saudi Arabia

References

 
Saudi Arabia
Bilateral relations of Saudi Arabia